The Lesotho records in swimming are the fastest ever performances of swimmers from Lesotho, which are recognised and ratified by the Lesotho Swimmers Association.

All records were set in finals unless noted otherwise.

Long Course (50 m)

Men

Women

Short Course (25 m)

Men

Women

References

Lesotho
Records